Burunköy is a village in Mut district of Mersin Province, Turkey. Population of Burunköy was 290 as of 2012.

References

Villages in Mut District